This is a list of modern individuals. For early Christian authors, see List of Syriac writers. For ancient Assyrians, see :Category:Ancient Assyrians.

The following is a list of notable ethnic Assyrians. It includes persons who are from (or whose ancestry is from) the Mesopotamian Neo-Aramaic speaking populations originating in Iraq, north western Iran, north eastern Syria and south eastern Turkey.

Activists
Ninos Aho – poet and founding father of modern Assyrian nationalism
Freydun Atturaya – physician, poet and founder of the first Assyrian political party, the Assyrian Socialist Party
Wilson Bet-Mansour – Physician, Assyrian and Chaldean Member of Parliament of Iran 1968-1976, Founder and First Secretary General of Assyrian Universal Alliance (AUA), Founder publisher and editor of Atour newspaper published monthly in Assyrian, English and Farsi from 1968-1979 with a global circulation, Founder of first global Assyrian political party Nineveh Liberation Party 1969-1979; Founder of representation for AUA at UNPO (Unrepresented Nations and Peoples Organizations) 1992 Assyrian nationalism
Lado Davidov – Soviet soldier during the Second World War and Hero of the Soviet Union
Naum Faiq – writer, poet and founding father of modern Assyrian nationalism
Jumana Hanna – involved in anti Baath war propaganda, torture victim
Reine Hanna – Director of the Assyrian Policy Institute
Nuri Kino – award-winning journalist, documentary filmmaker, author, human rights expert, and founder of A Demand for Action
Rosie Malek-Yonan – actress, author, director, public figure and human rights activist
Hurmiz Malik Chikko – martyr and leader of the Assyrian armed struggle against the Ba'ath regime in Iraq in the late 1950s – early 1960s
Farid Nazha – journalist and founding father of modern Assyrian nationalism
Juliana Taimoorazy – founder and president of the Iraqi Christian Relief Council, senior fellow at the Philos Project

Actors, directors and entertainers
F. Murray Abraham – Academy Award-winning actor
Brian Awadis – YouTuber
Henri Charr – director
Michael Denkha – actor
Naguib el-Rihani – actor
Fares Fares – Swedish-Lebanese actor
Andre Khabbazi – actor
Iloosh Khoshabe – actor; bodybuilder
Nuri Kino – journalist; filmmaker
Terrence Malick – Academy Award-nominated director

Artists and designers

Eser Afacan – painter, and sculptor
Hannibal Alkhas – sculptor, painter and author
Issa Benyamin – calligrapher
Raad Ghantous – interior designer
Thea Halo – painter and writer
Farouk Kaspaules – artist
Paulus Khofri – painter, lyricist and composer
Jim Marshall – photographer
Bishara Morad – artist
Fred Parhad – sculptor

Athletes

In the Middle East

Athletics (Track and field)
George Malek-Yonan – Iranian Assyrian Track & Field Athlete. Iran's Champion of Champions, Gold medalist in Pentathlon and Track & Field

Boxing
Mustafa Hamsho – Syrian Assyrian/Syriac boxer, middleweight
George Issabeg – Iranian Assyrian boxer; represented Iran in 1948 and 1952 Summer Olympics
Anwar Oshana – Syrian Assyrian boxer, super middleweight in USA. Illinois State Champion
Shoura Osipov – Iranian Assyrian boxer 1948 Summer Olympics representing Iran

Football (soccer)
Douglas Aziz – Iraqi Assyrian footballer
Ammo Baba – Iraqi Assyrian footballer and Manager of Iraq – Iraq International. Voted best Iraqi Athlete of All Time
Saad Benyamin – Iraqi Assyrian footballer – Iraq International
Edison David – Iraqi Assyrian footballer
Youra Eshaya – Iraqi Assyrian footballer, first Iraqi to play professionally in the west, for Bristol Rovers, England – Iraq International
Basil Gorgis Hanna – Iraqi Assyrian footballer – World Cup Player 1986
Aram Karam – Iraqi Assyrian footballer – Iraq International
Ayoub Odisho – Iraqi Assyrian footballer and club manager (in Lebanon)
Thamer Yousif – Iraqi Assyrian footballer – Iraq International

Tennis
Andrew Simon – Iraqi Assyrian Tennis Champion

Diaspora

American football
Alex Agase – Assyrian American – top level American Football (Gridiron) player
Lou Agase – Assyrian American – top level American Football (Gridiron) player

Boxing

Mustafa Hamsho
Sammy Merza – USA based middleweight
Anwar Oshana – Assyrian American super middleweight boxer, Illinois State Champion
Isho Shiba – Assyrian Canadian boxer – Canadian champion

Fencing (sabre)
George Yako – Assyrian/Australian sabre fencer - Australian based

Football (soccer)
Alexander Alkhazov – Assyrian Russian footballer – plays for FC Krylia Sovetov Samara
Zaya Avdysh – Assyrian Ukrainian footballer – Ukrainian based
Kennedy Bakircioglu – Assyrian Swedish international footballer – Sweden based – Swedish International player
Abgar Barsom – Assyrian Swedish footballer
Stefan Batan – Assyrian Swedish footballer – plays for Assyriska
Steven Beitashour – currently plays for Los Angeles FC in Major League Soccer, Iran international
Louay Chanko – Assyrian Syrian footballer – Denmark based – Syrian International player
Imad Chhadeh – Assyrian Swedish footballer – plays for Assyriska
Daniyel Cimen – Assyrian German footballer
Christian Demirtas – Assyrian German footballer – German based
Sargon Duran – Assyrian Austrian footballer – plays for FC Sollenau
Jimmy Durmaz – Assyrian Swedish footballer
David Durmaz – Assyrian Swedish footballer – plays for Syrianska FC
Ninos Gouriye – Assyrian Dutch footballer
Andreas Haddad – Assyrian Swedish footballer – plays for Assyriska
Dani Hamzo – Assyrian Swedish footballer – plays for Assyriska
Zurab Ionanidze – Assyrian Georgian International footballer – Georgian International player
Mikael Ishak – Assyrian Swedish footballer – plays for Assyriska
Leena Khamis – Assyrian Australian female footballer – Australian Women's Football International
Sanharib Malki – Assyrian Syrian footballer – Dutch based (Roda JC) – Syrian International player
Justin Meram – Assyrian USA based soccer player
Ilyas Merkes – Assyrian Syrian footballer – Syrian International player, plays for Assyriska
George Mourad – Assyrian Syrian footballer – Iran based – Syrian International player
Eddie Moussa – Assyrian Swedish footballer – plays for Assyriska
Michel Noyan – Assyrian Swedish footballer – plays for Assyriska
Gabriel Özkan – Assyrian Swedish footballer – plays for AIK Fotboll
Frans Dhia Putros – Assyrian Danish footballer – plays for Hobro IK in Denmark
Mario Shabow – Assyrian Australian footballer – plays for Central Coast Mariners in the Australian A-League
Suleyman Sleyman – Assyrian Swedish footballer – plays for Syrianska FC
Rebin Sulaka – Assyrian Swedish footballer – Iraq International
Jasar Takak – Dutch based Assyrian footballer, formerly of Vitesse Arnhem
Sharbel Touma – Assyrian Swedish footballer – plays for Syrianska FC
Gabriel Ucar – Assyrian Swedish footballer – plays for Ängelholms FF, and previously for Irish team Derry City
Daniel Unal – Assyrian Turkish footballer – plays for FC Basle in Switzerland
Andreas Yacoub-Haddad – Assyrian Swedish footballer – played for Assyriska
Christer Youssef – Assyrian Swedish footballer – plays for Djurgårdens IF

Martial Arts

Beneil Dariush – Assyrian American Mixed martial arts (MMA)
Randa Markos – Assyrian Canadian Mixed martial arts (MMA)
Tiras Odisho – Assyrian Iraqi Karate champion, currently Director General of National Olympic Committee of Iraq
Mikhail Sado – Assyrian Russian Wrestling champion
David Teymur – Assyrian Swedish Mixed martial arts (MMA)

Poker

Daniel Alaei

Tennis
Andre Agassi – former world number one American tennis player of Assyrian and Armenian descent
Andre Khabbazi – American actor and semi-pro tennis player
Michael Shabaz – American tennis player

Educators and explorers
Aba I – philosopher, astronomer
Aphrahat – 3rd century theologian
Toma Audo – bishop, writer
Babai (Nestorian Patriarch) – bishop
Babai the Great – philosopher, theologian
Bardaisan – philosopher
Paul Bedjan
Bukhtishu – were a family of Assyrian Nestorian Christian physicians from the 7th, 8th, and 9th centuries, spanning six generations and 250 years. 
Louis Cheikhô – Assyrian Orientalist
Hind Rassam Culhane – lecturer in Middle Eastern Studies and behavioural scientist
Fuat Deniz – writer and professor of sociology at Örebro University
Mor Philoxenos Yuhanon Dolabani – scholar, poet, editor, and translator
Eprime Eshag – academic, professor
Hunayn ibn Ishaq – scholar, physician, scientist, and translator
Emanuel Kamber
George Kiraz – computational linguist
Kanan Makiya – academic, professor
Masawaiyh – physician
Eden Naby
Estiphan Panoussi – philosopher and oriental philologist
Philoxenos – theologian
Hormuzd Rassam – Assyriologist, and first-known Middle Eastern archaeologist
Sandra Chimon Rogers – Dean, academic leader, doctor, professor, researcher, chemist, Alzheimer's preventative specialist, solid state NMR specialist, TEDx speaker, and award-winning innovator for education
Thomas L. Saaty – Iraqi born Assyrian American mathematician
Mikhail Sado – Russian linguist, scholar, professor of Semitic languages, orientalist, politician, former paratrooper, and wrestling champion
Toma bar Yacoub – 9th Century theological historian
Donny George Youkhanna
Ashur Yousif

Entrepreneurs

Narsai David – American restaurateur, chef, wine-maker, and author
Daniel Hadad – Argentine businessman involved in telecommunications and media
Sue Ismiel – founder of Nad's, a multimillion-dollar wax and beauty company in Australia with distributions worldwide.
Milton Malek-Yonan – American inventor of Malekized Rice
Bob Miner – American businessman, co-founder of Oracle Corporation
Jeff Moorad – American businessman and investor, CEO of MLB's Arizona Diamondbacks, and Vice-Chairman and CEO of MLB's San Diego Padres
Victor Nacif – Mexian businessman, Vice President of Design at Nissan Design Europe
Tony Rezko – American businessman, political fundraiser, restaurateur, and real estate developer.

Leaders

Malik Khoshaba – Assyrian Military leader World War I
Agha Petros – World War I Assyrian General
Ashur Yousif – professor and Assyrian nationalist

Media

Ramona Amiri – Miss World Canada 2005
John Batchelor – author; radio host
Jack Douglas – television host
Claudia Hanna – Miss Iraq 2006
Craig Morgan – sports journalist
Jennifer Aydin — reality television personality
Larsa Pippen — reality television personality
Cindy Sargon – Australian TV chef
Nancy Oshana Wehbe – body builder and model
Patrick Bet-David
Obelit Yadgar – American radio personality
Alfred Yaghobzadeh – Iranian photojournalist

Musicians and composers

 Evin Agassi
 L3DD
 Mousey Alexander
 Joseph Arabbo
 Gabriel Asaad
 Jamil Bashir
 Munir Bashir
 Ashur Bet Sargis
 Aril Brikha
 Sargon Gabriel
 Linda George
 Nouri Iskandar
 Juliana Jendo
 Elias Karam
Sargon Kenoun
Ninous Kenoun
Mark Anthony Yaeger
Paulus Khofri
Adwar Mousa
Habib Mousa
Hanna Petros
Janan Sawa
Timz
Marganita Vogt-Khofri
Elias Zazi

Politicians
Dala Ashur – Assyrian Iraqi Army General of Saddam Hussein's Armed Forces
Tariq Aziz – Deputy Prime Minister of Iraq 1979–2003 (Real name Michael Youkhana)
Basim Bello – Mayor of Tel Kaif, Iraq
Yonathan Betkolia – Secretary General of the Assyrian Universal Alliance and Iran Parliament Representative
Bahnam Zaya Bulos – Iraq Minister of Transport (2003–2004)
Basimah Yusuf Butrus – Iraq Minister of Science and Technology 2005–2006
Elizabeth Gawrie – Deputy Prime Minister of Rojava
Kamel Hana Gegeo – chief bodyguard to Saddam Hussein
Franso Hariri – Mayor of Erbil
Fawzi Franso Hariri – Iraq Parliament Representative, Current Minister of Industry in Iraq
Yonadam Kanna – Secretary General of the Assyrian Democratic Movement and Iraq Parliament Representative
Sarkis Aghajan Mamendo – current Minister of Finance and Economy in Kurdistan Regional Government
Wijdan Michael – current Minister of Human Rights in Iraq
Tiras Odisho – Director General of National Olympic Committee of Iraq
Tiras Odisho – head of the Iraqi Olympic Committee
Ablahad Afraim Sawa – Iraq Parliament Representative
Lady Surma D'Bait Mar Shimun (Surma Khanum)
Pascal Esho Warda – Iraq Minister of Immigration and Refugees 2003–2004
Albert Edward Ismail Yelda – Iraq Ambassador to the Vatican
Yusuf Salman Yusuf – Secretary General of Iraqi Communist Party 1941–1949

Iran
Freydun Atturaya – co-founder of the Assyrian Socialist Party

Turkey
Erol Dora – Deputy of Grand National Assembly of Turkey
Naum Faiq – Assyrian nationalist

United Nations
Dr. William Ishaya – Deputy Permanent Representative – Mission of the Republic of Iraq to the United Nations in New York, USA.

In the Assyrian diaspora

United States
Mark Arabo – politician based in San Diego, California
Adam Benjamin, Jr. – Indiana Congressman
Wadie Deddeh – former California State Senator
Anna Eshoo – California Congresswoman
John Nimrod – Illinois Senator
Atour Sargon – Lincolnwood Trustee

Australia
Ninos Khoshaba – former Member of the New South Wales Parliament Sydney Australia
Andrew Rohan – current State Member for Smithfield New South Wales Parliament, and Fairfield City Council Councillor for the Liberal Party of Australia

Sweden
Metin Ataseven – Sweden Parliament Representative
Ibrahim Baylan – Sweden Minister of Education 2004–2006 and Sweden Parliament Representative
Yilmaz Kerimo – Sweden Parliament Representative

Canada
Helena Guergis – former Canadian Member of Parliament and Minister of State (Status of Women)

Netherlands
Attiya Gamri – Netherlands Parliament Representative, president of the Assyrian Confederation of Europe

Other countries
Iskender Alptekin – politician, singer and former President of the European Syriac Union
José Murat Casab – (born to Iraqi immigrants) Mexican politician and a member of the Institutional Revolutionary Party also former Governor of Oaxaca
Sargon Dadesho – activist, author and leader of Assyrian National Congress
Eugene Dooman
Emmanuel Kamber – Assyrian Universal Alliance Secretary General

Religious figures

Addagoppe of Harran
Babai the Great, 551–628
Bar Daisan
Bar-Hebraeus
Bar Sauma
Basile Georges Casmoussa
David Benjamin Keldani
Diodorus of Tarsus
Dinkha IV, 1935–2015
Elias Mellus
Emil Shimoun Nona
Emmanuel III Delly
Ephrem the Syrian
George Garmo
Heliodorus – 4th Century Assyrian martyr
Henana of Adiabene
Ignatius Isaac Azar
Isaac of Nineveh
Isa Kelemechi
Jacob of Nisibis
Josephus Adjutus – 17th century theologian
Louis Cheikho
Nestorius
Paulos Faraj Rahho
Pkidha, 104–114 – first Bishop of Adiabene
Ragheed Aziz Ganni
Raphael I Bidawid
Sargis Bkheera, 633 AD
Shimun XXI Eshai
Shimun XIX Benyamin, 1903–1918
Shlemon Warduni
Tatian, 120–180
Theodore of Mopsuestia
Toma bar Yacoub
Youhannan Semaan Issayi
Yousip Khnanisho, 1893–1977
Yusuf Akbulut

Writers and poets

Ancient

Listed here are authors associated with Syriac Christianity regardless of whether they wrote in the Syriac language.

Aphrahat
Bar Daysan
Iamblichus of Chalcis
John bar Penkaye
John of Ephesus
Lucian of Samosata, 125–after 180 – Assyrian rhetorician, writer and satirist who wrote in the Greek language
Moses Bar-Kepha
Philoxenus of Mabbog
Stephen Bar Sudhaile
Tatian

Modern
Maria Theresa Asmar
Yosip Bet Yosip
Sargon Boulus
Nina Burleigh
William D. S. Daniel
Fuat Deniz
Thea Halo
Samuel John Hazo 
Ivan Kakovitch
Paulus Khofri
George Lamsa
Rosie Malek-Yonan
Gabriel J. Kenoun
Sabrina Kenoun
Robert Kenoun
Ramman Kenoun
Terrence Malick
Dunya Mikhail
Alphonse Mingana
Murathan Mungan
Leilah Nadir
Heather Raffo
Mikhael K. Pius
Yuhanon Qashisho
Jacob of Serugh
Ishaya Shamasha Dawid Bet-Zia

See also
Assyrian/Chaldean/Syriac people

References

External links

 *
Lists of people by ethnicity

Hannibal Alkhas
Dali Hadad